The 1979–80 QMJHL season was the 11th season in the history of the Quebec Major Junior Hockey League. Ten teams played 72 games each in the schedule. The Sherbrooke Castors finished first overall in the regular season, winning the Jean Rougeau Trophy. The Cornwall Royals, led by rookie Dale Hawerchuk won the President's Cup, defeating the Sherbrooke Castors in the finals. Cornwall went on to win the 1980 Memorial Cup, winning their second Memorial Cup championship.

Team changes
 The Laval National are renamed the Laval Voisins.
 The Verdun Éperviers return to Sorel, Quebec, mid-season.

Final standings
Note: GP = Games played; W = Wins; L = Losses; T = Ties; Pts = Points; GF = Goals for; GA = Goals against

complete list of standings.

Scoring leaders
Note: GP = Games played; G = Goals; A = Assists; Pts = Points; PIM = Penalties in minutes

 complete scoring statistics

Playoffs
Dale Hawerchuk was the leading scorer of the playoffs with 45 points (20 goals, 25 assists).

Quarterfinals
 Sherbrooke Castors defeated Hull Olympiques 4 games to 0.
 Cornwall Royals defeated Shawinigan Cataractes 4 games to 3.
 Chicoutimi Saguenéens defeated Trois-Rivières Draveurs 4 games to 3.
 Montreal Juniors defeated Quebec Remparts 4 games to 1.

Semifinals
 Sherbrooke Castors defeated Montreal Juniors 4 games to 1.
 Cornwall Royals defeated Chicoutimi Saguenéens 4 games to 1.

Finals
 Cornwall Royals defeated Sherbrooke Castors 4 games to 2.

All-star teams
First team
 Goaltender - Paul Pageau, Shawinigan Cataractes 
 Left defence - Fred Arthur, Cornwall Royals
 Right defence - Gaston Therrien, Quebec Remparts
 Left winger - Gilles Hamel, Chicoutimi Saguenéens
 Centreman - J. F. Sauve, Trois-Rivières Draveurs & Denis Savard, Montreal Juniors
 Right winger - Denis Cyr, Montreal Juniors 
 Coach - Doug Carpenter, Cornwall Royals
Second team
 Goaltender - Corrado Micalef, Sherbrooke Castors 
 Left defence - Normand Rochefort, Trois-Rivières Draveurs
 Right defence - Dave Ezard, Cornwall Royals 
 Left winger - Pierre Aubry, Trois-Rivières Draveurs & Louis Begin, Sherbrooke Castors 
 Centreman - Guy Carbonneau, Chicoutimi Saguenéens
 Right winger - Brian Johnson, Sherbrooke Castors
 Coach - Ghislain Delage, Sherbrooke Castors & Gaston Drapeau, Quebec Remparts
 List of First/Second/Rookie team all-stars.

Trophies and awards
Team
President's Cup - Playoff Champions, Cornwall Royals.
Jean Rougeau Trophy - Regular Season Champions, Sherbrooke Castors.
Robert Lebel Trophy - Team with best GAA, Sherbrooke Castors.

Player
Michel Brière Memorial Trophy - Most Valuable Player, Denis Savard, Montreal Juniors.
Jean Béliveau Trophy - Top Scorer, J. F. Sauve, Trois-Rivières Draveurs.
Guy Lafleur Trophy - Playoff MVP, Dale Hawerchuk, Cornwall Royals.
Jacques Plante Memorial Trophy - Best GAA, Corrado Micalef, Sherbrooke Castors.
Emile Bouchard Trophy - Defenceman of the Year, Gaston Therrien, Quebec Remparts.
Michel Bergeron Trophy - Rookie of the Year, Dale Hawerchuk, Cornwall Royals .
Frank J. Selke Memorial Trophy - Most sportsmanlike player, J. F. Sauve, Trois-Rivières Draveurs.

See also
1980 Memorial Cup
1980 NHL Entry Draft
1979–80 OMJHL season
1979–80 WHL season

References
 Official QMJHL Website
 www.hockeydb.com/

Quebec Major Junior Hockey League seasons
QMJHL